Danute "Bunki" Bankaitis-Davis (January 2, 1958 – January 29, 2021) was an American road racing cyclist. She won a gold medal at the 1992 UCI Road World Championships in the team time trial. She competed at the 1988 Summer Olympics in the women's road race finishing 14th.

Born to Lithuanian parents, Bunki Bankaitis-Davis competed in the women’s road race at the 1988 Seoul Olympics, finishing 14th. She started out as a volleyball player, earning a scholarship to Cleveland State University where she studied chemistry. Bankaitis-Davis later earned a PhD in organic chemistry from the University of North Carolina. She started working with Amgen in Boulder, Colorado, but left after several years and started her own company, Source Molecular Diagnostics, which does molecular blood tests.

She was inducted into the United States Bicycling Hall of Fame in 2021.

References

External links
 

1958 births
2021 deaths
American female cyclists
Cyclists at the 1988 Summer Olympics
Olympic cyclists of the United States
UCI Road World Champions (women)
American people of Lithuanian descent
21st-century American women